During the 1990–91 English football season, Oldham Athletic A.F.C. competed in the Football League Second Division. A 1st-placed finish in the final table saw promotion and a place in the Football League First Division for the 1991–92 season.

Season summary
Oldham enjoyed promotion to the top flight after an absence of 68 years after finishing in 1st place.

Results
Home team's score comes first

Legend

Football League Second Division

FA Cup

League Cup

References

1990–91
Oldham Athletic